Richard Morales Jr. (born July 18, 1979), better known by his stage name Gunplay, is an American rapper. He embarked on his career in hip hop as a member of fellow Florida-based rapper Rick Ross's southern hip hop group Triple C's. Triple C's released their debut album, Custom Cars & Cycles, in 2009. After signing to Ross's Maybach Music Group label, upon its inception in 2009, Gunplay would announce he secured a solo recording contract with Def Jam Recordings, in July 2012. He released several mixtapes, such as 601 & Snort. His debut studio album, titled Living Legend, was released in 2015.

Early life
Born Richard Morales Jr.  to a Puerto Rican father and Jamaican mother in 1979, Morales spent some of his early childhood in Opa-Locka, Florida. By age 10, Morales' parents divorced and the family split. His father returned to Puerto Rico. Morales, his mother and younger brother later settled in Carol City located in Dade County. At age 15, Morales dropped out of high school after being told he would have to repeat ninth grade. After leaving school, Morales started using and selling cocaine at age 16 saying he used to spend $600–700 a week on drugs and thousands after his record deal.

Music career

1997–2009: Career beginnings with Triple C's
In 1997, he met with Carol City native Rick Ross and their passion for music led them to form the group Triple C's (Carol City Cartel) alongside rappers Torch and Young Breed. The group released their debut album Custom Cars & Cycles in 2009, which debuted at #44 on the U.S. Billboard 200.

2009–2014: Solo career
Gunplay made his solo debut by appearing on Rick Ross' track "Gunplay" on his album Deeper Than Rap (2009). He released mixtapes under Maybach Music Group while appearing on featured tracks and making appearances on collaborative albums. In July 2012, he signed a solo deal with Def Jam. He released his first mixtape, 601 & Snort, in September 2012. It was praised by critics and was named the tenth best album of 2012 by Spin magazine. One of his featured guest appearance songs, "Cartoon & Cereal" with Kendrick Lamar, was ranked in Complexs Best 50 Songs of 2012 list at #2. Gunplay's mixtape Cops & Robbers was released on January 18, 2013. Gunplay was featured on Dirty Diana's R.I.P. To The Competition in June 2013. He was also featured on Lil Wayne's 2013 album I Am Not a Human Being II on the song "Beat The Shit".

2015–present: Living Legend
Gunplay's debut album, Living Legend, was released on July 31, 2015. It had first been announced in 2012, initially with the title Bogota, then the title Medellin. Gunplay described the album as "raw" and a "real street album" by Gunplay. The album includes guest appearances by Rick Ross and Yo Gotti, among others. It was meant to include other collaborations, like a track with Big Sean and a track produced by Pharrell Williams titled "Steel Drums", but these did not materialize. Four singles were released from Living Legend: "Tell 'Em", "Wuzhanindoe", "Be Like Me" and "Blood on the Dope". He is set to be included on another long-awaited album, Maybach Music Group's fourth collaborative album, Self Made 4.

In 2019, Gunplay released a full-length collaboration album called Chop Stixx and Banana Clips with Mozzy. Writing about the project for Freemusicempire Dan-O praised the project "Gunplay and Mozzy paint pictures so you can see the crook's whole journey, not just the sentence".

Personal life
Gunplay has a son, Richard Morales III (b. 2003 or 2004), with his ex-wife, whom he divorced in 2008. Gunplay practices Santeria, stating that he felt a 'deeper connection' with God when he began practicing it.

Legal issues
TMZ reported that on Wednesday, October 10, 2012, Gunplay turned himself in to Miami authorities after a warrant was issued for his arrest on charges of armed robbery. According to the rapper's attorney, Gunplay could have faced life in prison if convicted on both counts. On October 22, 2012, he was given a $150,000 bond and placed on house arrest in connection to the robbery which took place at a Miami tax business. He was released from house arrest during January 2013. On February 25, 2013, Gunplay's trial began on the charges of armed robbery, assault with a deadly weapon and aggravated assault, stemming from when he allegedly pulled a gun on his accountant during April 2012. On the same day, it was announced that the case was dismissed because the victim, Turron Woodside, refused to further cooperate with authorities. Woodside refused to authenticate the footage of the incident and was "out of town" according to his family. Subsequently, the prosecution in the armed robbery case was forced to drop the charges against Gunplay.

Controversies
Gunplay has a swastika tattoo and has given differing explanations for it. In a 2012 interview with Pigeons & Planes, Gunplay said he deliberately uses the tattoo to conflate Nazi atrocities with his intentions to deal with "bullshit out here." He continued: "I came to Nazi that shit. I came to Hitler that motherfucker. Put all the fake motherfuckers in the gas chamber and gas your fuck ass. That's what I'm here to do." Several months later, in a 2013 interview with Complex, he said: "Swastika was originally a sign of peace, happiness, and love. The Nazis turned it into the symbol of death. That's the same way I feel society does to people. We start off as innocent babies and it turns us into monsters. If the shoe fits, wear it." At the 2012 BET Hip Hop Awards, Gunplay was involved in a fist fight with members of 50 Cent's G-Unit affiliates backstage.

DiscographyStudio Albums'''
 2009: Custom Cars & Cycles (with Triple C's)
 2015: Living Legend 2017: The Plug 2017: Haram 2018: ACTIVE 2022: All Bullshit Aside''

References

1979 births
American people of Puerto Rican descent
American rappers of Jamaican descent
Gangsta rappers
Def Jam Recordings artists
African-American male rappers
Southern hip hop musicians
Rappers from Miami
People from Carol City, Florida
Living people
21st-century American rappers
21st-century American male musicians
21st-century African-American musicians
20th-century African-American people